Kari Karlsen (born 5 February 1952) is a retired Norwegian high jumper. She represented Oslo IL.

She finished tenth at the 1970 European Indoor Championships, eleventh at the 1971 European Indoor Championships and thirteenth at the 1974 European Indoor Championships. She became Norwegian champion in the years 1970-1973.

Her personal best jump was 1.80 metres, achieved in July 1971 in London.

References

1952 births
Living people
Norwegian female high jumpers